Sub Sub were an English dance act from Handforth, Cheshire composed of Jimi Goodwin and twin brothers Andy and Jez Williams.

The threesome met at school in 1985 and became regulars at The Haçienda while composing their own material together. They had an underground 12" single ("Space Face" in 1991) and moderate commercial success in the early 1990s on Rob Gretton's label Rob's Records, including the single "Ain't No Love (Ain't No Use)" (featuring guest vocalist Melanie Williams) which reached No. 3 on the UK Singles Chart. The trio's only album, Full Fathom Five, was released in September 1994.

After a fire destroyed their recording studio on Blossom Street in the Ancoats area of Manchester on the Williams twins' birthday in 1996, they started anew as the more indie-oriented act Doves in 1998. An unreleased collection of tracks meant to be featured on the band's second album was issued in 1998 as Delta Tapes.

Discography

Albums
Full Fathom Five (Rob's Records, ROB 30; September 1994)
 "Coast"
 "Angel" (featuring Nina Henchion)
 "Valium Jazz"
 "Southern Trees" (featuring Gill Jackson)
 "Inside of This"
 "Ain't No Love (Ain't No Use)" (featuring Melanie Williams)
 "Flute Track"
 "Swamp"
 "Respect" (featuring Nina Henchion)
 "Past"

Delta Tapes (compilation album; Cortex Records, February 1998)
 "Crunch"
 "This Time I'm Not Wrong" (featuring Bernard Sumner)
 "Lost in Watts"
 "Jaggernath"
 "Firesuite"
 "Smoking Beagles" (featuring Tricky)
 "Clear Blue Water"
 "Heads Will Roll"
 "Past"

Singles and EPs
 "Space Face" (January 1991), Ten Records
 "Space Face" (Todd Terry Remixes) (January 1991), Ten Records
 Coast EP (June 1992), Rob's Records
 "Ain't No Love (Ain't No Use)" (March 1993), Rob's Records
 "Ain't No Love (Ain't No Use)" (On Remixes) (March 1993), Rob's Records
 "Respect" (February 1994), Rob's Records
 "Angel" (August 1994), Rob's Records
 "Southern Trees" (January 1995), Rob's Records
 "Smoking Beagles" (December 1996), Rob's Records
 "This Time I'm Not Wrong" (August 1997), Rob's Records

Chart positions

References

External links
 Complete Sub Sub discography at Discogs.com
 Accurate and up to date info finding Sub Sub's "Delta Tapes" on CD

English dance music groups
English house music groups
Musical groups from Cheshire
Musical groups from Manchester
Madchester groups
Alternative dance musical groups
British musical trios